Stephen Otieno Adera (born 28 January 1990) Popularly known with his stage name Stevo Simple Boy, is a Kenyan rapper. He raps about social issues that affect the society. In 2019 he rose to fame after he released his song "Mihadarati" where he was addressing the dangers of drugs. This came after his appearance in Ebru TV's "Chipukeezy Show"

Early life
Stevo was born and raised in Oyugis, Homabay county in a family of eight before moving to Nairobi. He has been in the music scene since 2007 but started recording in 2015.

Music career
Stevo rose to fame in 2019 after a song he had previously released in 2017 dubbed "Mihadarati" hit the headlines. The song was played in several radio and TV stations in the region since it addressed the dangers of drug abuse. Stevo was named ambassador of the National Authority for the Campaign Against Alcohol and Drug Abuse (NACADA) of Kenya in the same year 2019.

In late 2019, Stevo released a song titled "Inauma" which translates to "it hurts". This track was inspired by the trolls he receives online. The singer has received online trolls several times throughout his career.

In 2020 he released a song titled "Tuheshimu Ndoa" which translates to "respect marriages". In the song he talks about marriage and encourages couples to respect marriages.

In 2022 early January, Stevo parted ways with his old management and joined a management and record label called Men in Business. Through a joint alliance from Vaga Genius (C.E.O – Men in Business), Vinc on the Beat and Chezaa Africa they helped revive his musical career with the song "Ni Nani" featuring Adasa.

References

External links
Stevo Simple Boy on 
Instagram

Kenyan rappers
21st-century rappers
1990 births
Living people